K’uk’ulkan, also spelled Kukulkan ("Plumed Serpent", "Amazing Serpent"), is the Mesoamerican serpent deity of the Pre-Columbine Yucatec Maya. It  is closely related to the deity Qʼuqʼumatz of the Kʼicheʼ people and to Quetzalcoatl of Aztec mythology. Prominent temples to Kukulkan are found at archaeological sites in the Yucatán Peninsula, such as Chichen Itza, Uxmal and Mayapan.

The depiction of the Feathered Serpent is present in other cultures of Mesoamerica. Although heavily Mexicanised, Kukulkan has its origins among the Maya of the Classic Period. Little is known of the mythology of this Pre-Columbian era deity.

Etymology 
In the Yucatec Maya language, the name is spelt Kʼukʼulkan and in Tzotzil it is Kʼukʼul-chon. The Yucatec form of the name is formed from the word kuk "feather" with the adjectival suffix -ul, giving kukul "feathered", combined with kan "snake" (Tzotzil chon), giving a literal meaning of "feathered snake".

Kukulkan has its origins among the Maya of the Classic Period, when it was known as Waxaklahun Ubah Kan, the War Serpent. It has been identified also as the Postclassic version of the Vision Serpent of Classic Maya art.

History 
The cult of Kukulkan/Quetzalcoatl was the first Mesoamerican religion to transcend the old Classic Period linguistic and ethnic divisions. This cult facilitated communication and peaceful trade among peoples of many different social and ethnic backgrounds. Although the cult was originally centred on the ancient city of Chichen Itza in the modern Mexican state of Yucatán, it spread as far as the Guatemalan Highlands and northern Belize.

In Yucatán, references to the deity Kukulkan are confused by references to a named individual who bore the name of the god. Because of this, the distinction between the two has become blurred. This individual appears to have been a ruler or priest at Chichen Itza who first appeared around the 10th century.
Although Kukulkan was mentioned as a historical person by Maya writers of the 16th century, the earlier 9th-century texts at Chichen Itza never identified him as human and artistic representations depicted him as a Vision Serpent entwined around the figures of nobles. At Chichen Itza, Kukulkan is also depicted presiding over sacrifice scenes.

Kukulkan and the Itza 
Kukulkan was a deity closely associated with the Itza state in the northern Yucatán Peninsula, where the religion formed the core of the Territorial religion. Although the worship of Kukulkan had its origins in earlier Maya traditions, the Itza worship of Kukulkan was heavily influenced by the Quetzalcoatl religion of central Mexico. This influence probably arrived via Putún Maya merchants from the Gulf Coast of Mexico. These Chontal merchants probably actively promoted the feathered serpent worshipers throughout Mesoamerica. Kukulkan headed a pantheon of deities of mixed Maya and non-Maya provenance, used to promote the Itza political and commercial agenda.  It also eased the passage of Itza merchants into central Mexico and other non-Maya areas, promoting the Itza economy.

At Chichen Itza, Kukulkan ceased to be the Vision Serpent that served as a messenger between the king and the gods and came instead to symbolise the divinity of the territory.

El Castillo, Chichen Itza served as a temple to Kukulkan. During the spring and fall equinoxes the shadow cast by the angle of the sun and edges of the nine steps of the pyramid combined with the northern stairway and the stone serpent head carvings create the illusion of a massive serpent descending the pyramid.

After the fall of Chichen Itza, the nearby Postclassic city of Mayapan became the centre of the revived Kukulkan worshipers, with temples decorated with feathered serpent columns. At the time of the Spanish colonization, the high priest of Kukulkan was the family patriarch of the Xiu faction and was one of the two most powerful men in the city.

The religion of Kukulkan spread as far as the Guatemalan Highlands and northern Belize, where Postclassic feathered serpent sculptures are found with open mouths from which protrude the heads of human warriors.

Modern folklore 
Stories are still told about Kukulkan among the modern Yucatec Maya. In one tale, Kukulkan is a boy who was born as a snake. As he grew older it became obvious that he was the plumed serpent and his sister cared for him in a cave. He grew to such a size that his sister was unable to continue feeding him, so he flew out of his cave and into the sea, causing an earthquake. To let his sister know that he is still alive, Kukulkan causes earth tremors every year in July.

A modern collection of folklore from Yucatán tells how Kukulkan was a winged serpent that flew to the sun and tried to speak to it but the sun, in its pride, burnt his tongue. The same source relates how Kukulkan always travels ahead of the Yucatec Maya rain god Chaac, helping to predict the rains as his tail moves the winds and sweeps the earth clean.

Among the Lacandon Maya of Chiapas, Kukulkan is an evil, monstrous snake that is the pet of the sun god. She destroys much of the world until she tries to herself during the long trip—the trip between the life and death. During the trip, she meets a boy who shares food with her and follows her back to the human world. She returns with him and constructs her own country.

In popular culture 
Kukulkan is a playable character in Smite as a mage.

Followers of the "Cult of Kukulkan" are portrayed as antagonists to Lara Croft in the video game Shadow of the Tomb Raider.

Kukulkan also appears in the Star Trek: The Animated Series episode "How Sharper Than a Serpent's Tooth" and the Star Trek: Lower Decks episode "Mining the Mind's Mines".

In the Marvel Cinematic Universe (MCU) film Black Panther: Wakanda Forever (2022), Tenoch Huerta Mejía portrays Namor, who is called K'uk'ulkan by the people of his underwater kingdom of Talokan, who worship him for his mutant abilities.

In the anime series Beyblade Burst, the character Kurt Baratier owns a Bey called "Beat Kukulkan", whose avatar is modelled after the winged serpent itself.

In the 1939 Doc Savage book, by Lester Dent, The Dagger in the Sky, the Black Stone of Kukulkan is a cursed stone. Kukulkan's curse is that anyone who has it dies and a black dagger will appear.

See also 
 Chichen Itza, a pre-Columbian Maya city
 Kukulcania,  a genus of crevice weaver spiders named in honor of this god.

Notes

References

Further reading 

 
 
 
 
 

Agricultural gods
Creator gods
Maya deities
Maya mythology and religion
Wisdom gods
Feathered serpent deities
Legendary serpents
Quetzalcoatl